The O.G. Hotel is one of Adelaide's oldest hotels, noted for its enigmatic name, the shortest in Australia.

History
The O.G. Hotel gained its licence before 1846, according to one reference on 6 July 1843, the proprietor being James Black.

Situated at Gilles Plains on what was then known as the road to Modbury (now designated as 246 North East Road, Klemzig), the name is generally recognised as a reference to Osmond Gilles, a major land holder in the area, though mention of this connection did not appear until the 20th century.

O.G. Road which runs alongside the hotel, does not appear in print until 1869, so it appears to have been named after the hotel.

Licensees
1843–1850 James Black
1850–1880 Edwin Bayfield 
1880–1890 William Gardener 
1890–1891 James W. Tunstall 
1891–1892 Alfred A. Hams 
1892–1914 James A. Musson 
1914–1920 Frank J. Heading 
1920 George J. Cook 
1920–1946 Edgar Stanley Rush 
1946–?? A. Gordon Miller and Phoebe M. Miller

References 

1843 establishments in Australia
Hotels in South Australia